The leaden antwren (Myrmotherula assimilis) is a species of bird in the family Thamnophilidae. It is found in the Amazon Basin. Its natural habitat is subtropical or tropical moist lowland forest.

The leaden antwren was described by the Austrian ornithologist August von Pelzeln in 1868 and given its current binomial name Myrmotherula assimilis.

References

leaden antwren
Birds of the Amazon Basin
leaden antwren
Taxonomy articles created by Polbot